Paltothemis is a genus of skimmers in the family Libellulidae.

Species
There are at least three species recognised in the genus Paltothemis:

References

Further reading

External links

 NCBI Taxonomy Browser, Paltothemis

Libellulidae